is a former Japanese football player.

Playing career
Akita was born in Kyoto Prefecture on July 23, 1974. Although he was a defender, he played also as midfielder and forward. After graduating from high school, he joined Nagoya Grampus Eight in 1993. On November 16, 1994, he debuted against JEF United Ichihara. However he only played in this one match for the club. In 1995, he moved to Regional Leagues club Blaze Kumamoto. In 1998, he moved to Regional Leagues club Nagoya SC. In October 2006, he moved to Japan Football League (JFL) club FC Kariya. In July 2007, he moved to JFL club Gainare Tottori and he played as a regular player. In 2009, he moved to J2 League club FC Gifu. He played in the J.League for the first time in 15 years. He played as a regular player in three seasons and retired at the end of the 2011 season. In 2013, he came back as a player in the Regional Leagues club Nagoya SC and played in one season.

Club statistics

References

External links

1974 births
Living people
Association football people from Kyoto Prefecture
Japanese footballers
J1 League players
J2 League players
Japan Football League players
Nagoya Grampus players
Nagoya SC players
FC Kariya players
Gainare Tottori players
FC Gifu players
Association football defenders